"Anywhere" is a song by English singer-songwriter Passenger. It was released as a digital download on 19 August 2016 in the United Kingdom, as the second single from his seventh studio album, Young as the Morning, Old as the Sea (2016).

Music video
The music video of "Anywhere" was first released on YouTube on 19 August 2016.

Track listing

Chart performance

Weekly charts

Release history

References

2016 singles
2016 songs
Passenger (singer) songs